For the Summer Olympics, there are nine venues that have been or will be used for baseball.

References

Baseball